Sir Peter Lytton Bazalgette (born 22 May 1953) is a British television executive and producer, also active in the fields of the arts and the broader Creative Industries.  Currently he is co-Chair of the Creative Industries Council, pro Chancellor and Chair of Council at the Royal College of Art, a non-executive board member at the Department of Education, Business Council chair of the Care Leavers Covenant, chair of the Baillie Gifford non fiction book prize and senior independent director on the board of Saga plc.  He was elected President of the Royal Television Society and Deputy Chairman of the National Film School. He was knighted in the New Year Honours for 2012 for services to broadcasting. He has been a benefactor to the arts and Chairman of English National Opera. He was Chair of Arts Council England from 2012 until 2016 and Chairman of ITV from 2016 to 2022. He is also Chair of LoveCrafts, the online retailer.  He was a non-executive board member of UK Research and Innovation (UKRI) and also served on the advisory board of BBH.  He sat on the board of the market researcher, YouGov, from 2003 to 2013.  In January 2017, his latest book The Empathy Instinct was published.

Personal life
Peter Bazalgette is the great-great-grandson of Victorian civil engineer Sir Joseph Bazalgette. A third cousin is Edward Bazalgette, who directed and produced the 2003 documentary The Sewer King which charted Sir Joseph Bazalgette's design and engineering of the London sewers. Peter Bazalgette presented a later television show for Five, called The Great Stink, and chaired the Crossness Engines Trust raising £4.5 million to restore the Victorian pumping station built by his ancestor.

For the first 12 years of his life Peter Bazalgette's parents did not have a television. He attended Dulwich College, and gained a third class degree in Law from Fitzwilliam College, Cambridge University while also becoming the president of the Cambridge Union Society.

He is married to intellectual property rights lawyer Hilary Newiss, with whom he has two children. The family lives in Notting Hill.

Career
Bazalgette joined the BBC News graduate news training scheme, and was subsequently picked by Esther Rantzen as a researcher on That's Life! from 1978. While a reporter at the BBC for Man Alive, he joined Eric Parsloe's video production company Epic. The BBC put him in charge of producing the programme Food and Drink, where he claims to have created the celebrity chef. He continued producing by forming his own production company Bazal, which created hits for British TV including Ready Steady Cook, Changing Rooms and Ground Force. In 1990, Bazal was acquired by Broadcast Communications, which itself was absorbed by Endemol.

In January 2005 Bazalgette became Chairman of Endemol UK and Creative Director of Endemol Group worldwide. He was responsible for shows including Big Brother and Deal or No Deal which were hits around the world, and led Endemol's digital entertainment strategy. Although Big Brother was an adaption of an existing series in the Netherlands, Bazalgette is credited with popularising the format around the world thanks to the adaptations he built into the UK version. During Bazalgette's time on the global board, Endemol grew strongly and in 2005 it was launched on the Dutch stock exchange. Over the next eighteen months it trebled in value and was sold in 2007 for €3.2 billion. In September 2007 it was announced that Bazalgette was standing down as Chairman and would assume the role of advisor.

Bazalgette has long championed the value of the BBC for its trusted news and critical investment in original programming and creative talent.  Along with others he has speculated how long the current funding model of the BBC will last, and whether in the future the licence fee might be reduced to pay specifically for core news and information content.

Bazalgette has been awarded fellowships by BAFTA and the Royal Television Society, and was president of the Royal Television Society 2010-2017. He was as a non-executive director of the Department for Culture, Media and Sport. In September 2012 he was appointed chairman of Arts Council England, and began his 4-year term on 31 January 2013.

The Independent argued that he may be "the most influential man in British television" as a result of his impact on the development of reality television and lifestyle TV programmes. The Daily Mail once named him as one of the "Ten Worst Britons" for Endemol's Channel 4 show Big Brother and the London Evening Standard television critic Victor Lewis-Smith said that Bazalgette had "done more to debase television over the past decade than anyone else."

In September 2012 it was announced that he would succeed Dame Elizabeth Forgan as Chair of the Arts Council England. This was during a time of cuts to public arts spending, partly remedied with a new system of tax credits. In September 2016 it was announced that Sir Nicholas Serota would replace him at the Arts Council England.

In February 2016 Bazalgette was named as the Chairman of ITV, effective from 12 May 2016. In March 2022 ITV announced that Peter Bazalgette would step down as Chairman of ITV, effective from 29 September 2022.

Other interests
Bazalgette has co-written four books including The Food Revolution, You Don't Have to Diet, and a biography of Egon Ronay. He is author of a study of the international TV formats business, Billion Dollar Game and, more recently, The Empathy Instinct. He is a speaker at global media events and lectures on media convergence and creativity. He has written widely on privacy and the internet, young people and voting, arts and philanthropy, public service broadcasting and student volunteering.  He is very active of the field of public policy as it relates to media and the creative industries.

He was a consultant to two of Sony’s television divisions in the UK, and was non-executive director of Base79. In early 2017, he was tasked with leading the new independent review of the creative industries for BEIS and DCMS. He is a former board member of Channel 4 and former Deputy Chairman of the National Film & Television School where he helped put up an £8million new teaching building. He was Chairman of English National Opera and was a Trustee of Debate Mate.

References

External links

Profile, The Guardian, May 2010; accessed 17 March 2014. 
Peter Bazalgette profile, Media Masterclass on Producing Television, blip.tv; accessed 17 March 2014.

The people who ruined the decade: PETER BAZALGETTE TV's posh popularist, guardian.co.uk; accessed 17 March 2014.

1953 births
Living people
People educated at Dulwich College
Alumni of Fitzwilliam College, Cambridge
Presidents of the Cambridge Union
British television executives
BAFTA fellows
Knights Bachelor
Businesspeople from London
Chairmen of ITV